Banksia nutans var. nutans is a variety of the plant Banksia nutans. It is native to the Southwest Botanical Province of Western Australia. As an autonym, its name is defined as containing the type specimen of the species.

References
 
 
 

nutans var. nutans
Eudicots of Western Australia